No. 9 Service Flying Training School (SFTS), Royal Canadian Air Force, was a flight training school, located at RCAF Station Summerside, PEI, and later, RCAF Station Centralia, Ontario. It was part of No. 3 Training Command RCAF, carrying out British Commonwealth Air Training Plan (BCATP) training operations.

Other schools which were the responsibility of No. 3 Training Command included Air Observer (AOS), Bombing and Gunnery (BGS), General Reconnaissance (ocean patrol) (GRS), Naval Aerial Gunnery (NAGS), Air Navigation (ANS) and Operational (OTU) training.

See also
Article XV squadrons
British Commonwealth Air Training Plan
RCAF Eastern Air Command
List of British Commonwealth Air Training Plan facilities in Canada

References

 Hatch, F.J. Aerodrome of Democracy: Canada and the British Commonwealth Air Training Plan 1939–1945. Ottawa: Canadian Department of National Defence, 1983. .

Flying Training Schools of Canada
Military units and formations established in the 1940s